Andre Begemann and Aliaksandr Bury were the defending champions but chose not to defend their title.

Roman Jebavý ang Zdeněk Kolář won the title after defeating Matwé Middelkoop and Igor Zelenay 6–2, 6–3 in the final.

Seeds

Draw

References
 Main Draw

Internazionali di Tennis del Friuli Venezia Giulia - Doubles
2017 Doubles
Friuli